Laki is a vernacular that consists of two dialects; Pish-e Kuh Laki and Posht-e Kuh Laki. Laki is considered a Kurdish dialect, by most linguists and is spoken chiefly in the area between Khorramabad and Kermanshah by about one million native speakers.

Geography 
Laki is spoken in Iran and in Turkey. In Iran, the isogloss of Laki spans from Khorramabad to east of Kermanshah, from Holeylan to Harsin. It's the main language in Selseleh, Delfan, Kuhdasht and Khawa counties in Lorestan Province, including Oshtorinan District of Borujerd County, and also around Malayer and Nahavand in Hamadan Province. In Kermanshah Province, it is the main language in Harsin County, Kangavar County, Sahneh County, and in the southern halves of Kermanshah County and Eslamabad-e Gharb County. There are also Laki enclaves in Khorasan, Kerman and around 100,000 speakers in 70 villages around Kelardasht in Mazandaran. In Gilan province, Laki is spoken by around 1,500 people.

In Turkey, the language is spoken by the Şêxbizin tribe, scattered around the country.

Classification 
The classification of Laki as a sub-dialect of Southern Kurdish or as a fourth dialect of Kurdish is unsettled, but the differences between Laki and the other Southern Kurdish dialects are minimal. However, linguist Fattah argues that Laki cannot be considered a dialect of Southern Kurdish since Laki is ergative and is thus a fourth Kurdish language.

Other linguists argue that Laki is closely related to Kurdish but refrain from deciding its place among the Northwestern Iranian languages.

Laki has also been classified as a Luri dialect, but speakers of Luri claim that Laki is "difficult or impossible to understand". Linguist Shahsavari points that Laki is sometimes seen as 'a transitional dialect between Kurdish and Luri'.

History

Oral literature 
Two significant groups of Laki oral literature are religious oral literature and astronomical literature. The first group includes Shia oral hymns and Yarsan songs, while the second gives an expansive and colorful account of Laki narratives of astronomical events and their consequences, the power of the sun, moon, the week and tales on the stars. A third and less significant group of Laki oral literature are verses on nature and the daily life. In the folklore of rural areas, fal gərtən or 'tell fortunes' are very important.

Written literature 

The use of Laki in literary writing is a more recent phenomenon and has therefore not been considerably developed. Historically, the use was impeded by the status of Gorani as koiné among Kurds which meant that speakers of Laki wrote their poetry in Gorani. Nonetheless, some early Laki works include the quatrain al-shi'r bi-l-fahlawīya (year 716 in hijri) which was preserved in a 14th century manuscript, and Jang-i Hamawan which was a freely adapted Laki version of the Shahnameh by Ferdowsi. Mele Perîşan (1356–1431) also wrote his diwan in Gorani influenced by Laki.

The most well-known manzuma in Laki is Darcenge written by Sayid Nushad Abu al-Wafa'i, a fellow of Sultan Sahak and contemporary of Nader Shah. The Darcenge contained questions concerning the events taking place in the world with sophisticated answers. This period also saw many Laki versions of the Kalâm-e Saranjâm.

In addition, there are many manuscripts titled Kule bad meaning 'the continuous wind' scattered around the region. These manuscripts appeared numerously in the late 16th century and early 17th century and were used to express benediction on nature and to request a wind which was appropriate for agricultural reasons. Important names from the 18th to the 20th century include Najaf Kalhuri (1739–1799), Tirkamir (d. 1815), Yaqub Maydashti, Mila Manuchichr Kuliwand and Mila Haqq Ali Siyahpush.

Laki phonology

Comparison of cognates

References

Bibliography

Further reading

Languages of Iran
Lak (tribe)
Kurdish language
Languages of Kurdistan
Languages of Turkey